Reynold's Candy Company Building is a historic commercial building located at Wilmington, New Castle County, Delaware. It was built in 1929 as a restaurant and
candy factory.  It is a three-story, three bay commercial building with a rectangular plan built of wall bearing brick construction.  It features a curved cast metal canopy over the front doors, an ornate white terra cotta facade, terra cotta panels with stylized vine pattern relief, and is in the Beaux Arts style.

It was added to the National Register of Historic Places in 1985.

References

Commercial buildings on the National Register of Historic Places in Delaware
Beaux-Arts architecture in Delaware
Commercial buildings completed in 1929
Buildings and structures in Wilmington, Delaware
National Register of Historic Places in Wilmington, Delaware